Pickens County Airport  is a county-owned public-use airport located four miles (6 km) south of the central business district of Pickens, in Pickens County, South Carolina, United States.

Facilities and aircraft 
For the 12-month period ending May 24, 2007, the airport had 40,100 aircraft operations, an average of 109 per day: 97% general aviation, 2% air taxi and <1% military. At that time there were 34 aircraft based at this airport: 79% single-engine, 12% multi-engine, 3% helicopter, 6% ultralight.

References

External links 

Airports in South Carolina
Buildings and structures in Pickens County, South Carolina
Transportation in Pickens County, South Carolina
Pickens, South Carolina